Aubrey Mather (17 December 1885 – 16 January 1958) was an English character actor.

Career
Mather was born in Minchinhampton, Gloucestershire, and began his career on the stage in 1905. He debuted in London in Brewster's Millions in 1909 and on Broadway ten years later in Luck of the Navy. He eventually branched out to films, starting with Young Woodley in 1930. He often played butlers. In the 1932 film The Impassive Footman he played the eponymous footman. He died in Harrow, London, aged 72.

Complete filmography

Young Woodley (1931) – Mr. Woodley
Aren't We All? (1932) – Vicar
Love on the Spot (1932) – Mr. Prior
The Impassive Footman (1932) – Dr. Bartlett
Tell Me Tonight (1932) – Balthasar
Red Wagon (1933) – Blewett
The Man Changed His Name (1934) – Sir Ralph Whitcombe
The Lash (1934) – Colonel Bush
The Admiral's Secret (1934) – Captain Brooke
Anything Might Happen (1934) – Seymour
The Silent Passenger (1935) – Mervyn Bunter
Ball at Savoy (1936) – Herbert
When Knights Were Bold (1936) – The Canon
As You Like It (1936) – Corin
Chick (1936) – The Dean
The Man in the Mirror (1936) – The Bogus of Bokhara
Sabotage (1936) – W. Brown & Sons Greengrocer (uncredited)
Underneath the Arches (1937) – Professor
Life Begins with Love (1937) – Roberts
London Wall (1938, TV Movie) – Mr. Walker
Little Ladyship (1939, TV Movie) – Mr. Jessup
The Shoemaker's Last (1939, TV Movie) – Herr Kaufmann
Jamaica Inn (1939) – Coachman (uncredited)
Magic (1939, TV Movie) – Doctor Grimthorpe
Sheppey (1939, TV Movie) – Sheppey
Just William (1940) – Fletcher
Captain Caution (1940) – Mr. Potter
Earl of Puddlestone (1940) – Lord Stoke-Newington
Spring Parade (1940) – Baron (uncredited)
Arise, My Love (1940) – Achille
No, No, Nanette (1940) – Remington, the butler
Road Show (1941) – Minister (uncredited)
Rage in Heaven (1941) – Clark
Men of Boys Town (1941) – Parsons, Maitland's Butler (uncredited)
Dr. Jekyll and Mr. Hyde (1941) – Inspector (uncredited)
Suspicion (1941) – Executor of General Laidlaw's Will (uncredited)
Ball of Fire (1941) – Prof. Peagram
The Wife Takes a Flyer (1942) – Chief Justice
This Above All (1942) – Second Headwaiter (uncredited)
Mrs. Miniver (1942) – George (uncredited)
The Affairs of Martha (1942) – Justin I. Peacock
Careful, Soft Shoulder (1942) – Mr. Fortune
A Yank at Eton (1942) – Widgeon – Carlton's Butler (uncredited)
The Undying Monster (1942) – Inspector Craig
Random Harvest (1942) – Sheldon
The Great Impersonation (1942) – Sir Ronald Clayfair
Forever and a Day (1943) – Man in Air Raid Shelter
Hello Frisco, Hello (1943) – Douglas Dawson
Heaven Can Wait (1943) – James
The Song of Bernadette (1943) – Mayor Lacade
Jane Eyre (1943) – Colonel Dent
The Lodger (1944) – Superintendent Sutherland
Wilson (1944) – Hughes' Butler (uncredited)
National Velvet (1944) – Entry Official
The Keys of the Kingdom (1944) – (scenes cut)
Sherlock Holmes and the House of Fear (1945) – Alastair
Temptation (1946) – Dr. Harding
The Mighty McGurk (1947) – Milbane
It Happened in Brooklyn (1947) – Digby John
For the Love of Rusty (1947) – Dr. Francis Xavier Fay
The Hucksters (1947) – Mr. Glass, Valet
Julia Misbehaves (1948) – The Vicar
Joan of Arc (1948) – Jean de la Fontaine
Adventures of Don Juan (1948) – Lord Chalmers
The Secret Garden (1949) – Dr. Griddlestone
The Secret of St. Ives (1949) – Daniel Romaine
Everybody Does It (1949) – Mr. Hertz (uncredited)
That Forsyte Woman (1949) – James Forsyte
The Importance of Being Earnest (1952) – Merriman
South of Algiers (1953) – Professor Young
Fast and Loose (1954) – Noony
To Dorothy a Son (1954) – Dr. Cameron

References

External links

English male film actors
English male stage actors
1885 births
1958 deaths
People from Minchinhampton
20th-century English male actors
British expatriate male actors in the United States